Mia Cooper may refer to:

Mia Cooper (violinist), Irish violinist with the Michael Nyman Band
Mia Cooper (singer), Nevada singer on The First Ten Years (Gabin album)
Mia Cooper, List of The Shapeshifter characters